Il Mercato delle facce is a 1952 Italian film.

Cast

External links
 

1952 films
1950s Italian-language films
Italian black-and-white films
1950s Italian films